Sphenophorus pontederiae is a species of snout or bark beetle in the family Curculionidae.  It is found in North America.

References

Further reading

 
 
 
 

Dryophthorinae
Beetles described in 1905